Waking Life OST is the official soundtrack of the film Waking Life. All tracks except numbers 6 and 9 were composed by Glover Gill and performed by the Tosca Tango Orchestra. Track 6 was originally composed by Frédéric Chopin and track 9 was composed by Julián Plaza.

Track listing

Personnel
 Glover Gill – accordion, piano (track 6)
 Lara Hicks – violin
 Ames Asbell – viola
 Leigh Mahoney – viola
 Sara Nelson – cello
 Jeanine Attaway – piano
 Erik Grostic – double bass
 Uncredited – oboe
 Uncredited – baritone guitar (track 9)

References

2001 soundtrack albums
Classical music soundtracks